Joshua Aukai Ligairi (born October 9, 1980) is an American filmmaker and podcaster, best known for the documentary Cleanflix (2012), which he wrote, directed, produced, and edited with filmmaker Andrew James. Ligairi co-created the non-fiction television miniseries Knights of Mayhem for National Geographic Channel in 2012 and appeared on the non-fiction competition show Pursuit of the Truth in 2013. Ligairi co-created the Movie Podcast Network in 2015. He hosts and produces several podcasts on the network. He founded the film production company Icarus Arts & Entertainment with his wife Rachel Mae Ligairi.

Early life 

Ligairi was born on October 9, 1980, in Oahu, Hawaii, the son of a Fijian immigrant father and an American mother who were both attending BYU-Hawaii and working at the Polynesian Cultural Center in Laie, Hawaii at the time.

Ligairi was raised in the Western United States. He attended Timpview High School in Provo, Utah where he was active in sports and the arts. He left the United States after high school, living in the Netherlands and Belgium. Ligairi returned to Utah after two years abroad and attended Utah Valley University, where he was awarded a Distinguished Alumni Award in 2013, in the field of Journalism.

Filmmaking 

Ligairi's film Cleanflix is a feature film documentary that premiered at the 2009 Toronto International Film Festival on September 11, 2009. The film centers around the movie sanitization company CleanFlicks and other similar companies that were sued by the Directors Guild of America for creating unauthorized, censored copies of their director's films.

Ligairi and James appeared at film festival screenings for Q&As in several U.S. cities including New York, Los Angeles, Salt Lake City, Nashville, Orlando, Boston, and Charlotte. Ligairi appeared on a panel discussion about the state of documentary film distribution with Michael Moore at Moore's State Theater during the Traverse City Film Festival in 2010. After winning the award for "Best Documentary" at the New York United Film Festival in late 2010, Ligairi and James signed a distribution deal with the festival's new distribution arm, United Films, in April 2011. The film was released to the public in 2012.

Ligairi co-created and developed the docu-reality miniseries Knights of Mayhem for National Geographic Channel in 2011. The series followed Charlie Andrews, the Captain of the Knights of Mayhem and World Champion Heavy-Armored Jouster, in his efforts to establish and legitimize the sport in the mainstream.

In 2012, Ligairi competed on a reality show called Pursuit of the Truth, created by Vince Vaughn and Glenn Beck, to find "the next great documentary filmmaker."  The series featured establish filmmakers Ligairi and Chris Bell (Bigger, Stronger, Faster*) as well as four first-time filmmakers, each setting out to create a feature film to be judged by an expert panel. The panel of judges included Tribeca Film Festival co-founder Craig Hatkof, Vaughn's business partner, Actor and Filmmaker Peter Billingsley (Couples Retreat), and documentary producer Daniel Chalfen (Budrus). The Pursuit of the Truth winner would receive funding and distribution from Beck's television network, TheBlaze. He ultimately placed third in the competition with his project, Plan 241, and was offered funding and distribution through TheBlaze, which he turned down. Ligairi has since been filming Plan 241 out-of-pocket.]

Podcasting 
Ligairi first began podcasting in 2011 with fellow documentary filmmakers Jay Cheel and Charlotte Cook for Cheel's website, TheDocumentaryBlog.com.  The podcast featured film reviews and interviews with documentary filmmakers. The podcast only lasted 12 episodes but was named one of the Top 10 Film Podcasts by USA Today's Whitney Matheson.

Ligairi began podcasting with former film critic Jason Pyles on Movie Podcast Weekly in 2012, first appearing as a guest on Episode 3 and beginning as an official host on Episode 14.

The two were supported by co-hosts Karl Huddelston and Andy Howell. The ensemble won four Podbody Awards in 2014, including prizes for "Best Podcast" and "Best Podcast Hosts." Ligairi was a co-host on the show for two years before announcing that he'd be taking a leave of absence for an undetermined amount of time on Episode 118.

Ligairi co-founded Horror Movie Podcast in 2013 with former film critic Jason Pyles and author / film professor Kyle William Bishop.

Film blogger Dave Becker of DVDInfatuation.com joined them as an official host on Episode 2. The ensemble was nominated for two Podbody Awards for "Best Podcast" and "Best Podcast Hosts" in 2014. Ligairi and Pyles lost those awards to themselves and their other show, Movie Podcast Weekly.

Ligairi took over Movie Stream Cast as producer and host from his Movie Podcast Weekly co-host Jason Pyles in November 2013. Initially hosting the show with his wife and sometimes producer, Rachel Mae Ligairi, he later added additional co-hosts including film critic Cody Clark, photographer Aaron Thompson, Andy Howell of Movie Podcast Weekly, and William Rowan Jr of The Sci-Fi Podcast.

Ligairi co-founded The Sci-Fi Podcast with Matt Daniels, Liz Gordon, and William Rowan Jr in March 2015. He joined the show as producer, initially to help with recording and mixing the episodes as well as creating artwork and handling web development. Ligairi eventually became a part-time co-host.

Ligairi co-founded Movie Podcast Network, as the producer of Movie Stream Cast.

Personal life 
Ligairi married Rachel Mae Ligairi, née Turley, in Salt Lake City, Utah in 2003. They have two children.

References

External links 
 
 Icarus Arts & Entertainment official website

1980 births
American filmmakers
American podcasters
Living people
People from Oahu